The 2020 Rhode Island Republican presidential primary was held on June 2, 2020 along with seven other Republican presidential primaries that day. All 19 of Rhode Island's delegates to the 2020 Republican National Convention were allocated according to the results. 

Donald Trump won the primary and all of the state's delegates.

Results

References

Rhode Island
Republican
Rhode Island Republican primaries